Saint-Fiacre-sur-Maine (literally Saint-Fiacre on Maine) is a commune in the Loire-Atlantique department in western France.

The inhabitants are Fiacrais.

Situated near Nantes, Saint-Fiacre is surrounded by Muscadet vineyards, between the rivers Sèvre Nantaise and Maine.

Geography

More of 80% of this commune is covered in vines, more than any other in France. There are more than 30 vine growers.
The communes bordering Saint-Fiacre-sur-Maine are: Vertou, La Haie-Fouassière, Château-Thébaud and Maisdon-sur-Sèvre.

History
Saint-Hilaire-du-Coing (Sanctus Hilarius del Cugno), was founded in the 6th century, becoming Saint-Fiacre-du-Coing (and Saint-Fiacre) in the 16th century because of pilgrimages to view the saint's statue.

Twin towns
Saint Fiacre sur Maine has a town twinning agreement with
  Echichens (Switzerland) since 1977

Population

See also
Communes of the Loire-Atlantique department

References

External links
 Official website

Communes of Loire-Atlantique